Thomas J. McCroskey (1874–October 28, 1948) was Mayor of Anchorage, Alaska from 1933 to 1934.

Biography
Tom McCroskey was born into a Santa Maria Valley pioneer family in Santa Barbara, California in 1874. He took part in the Fairbanks Gold Rush, moving to Fairbanks, Alaska in 1904 in order to prospect for gold. He took a job with the Alaska Road Commission in Fairbanks, and transferred to Anchorage in 1927.

In 1933, McCroskey defeated Carl E. Martin, 387 to 363 votes to become Mayor of Anchorage. He served a single term, and did not run again. In 1938, he retired to Santa Barbara, where he died on October 28, 1948, at the age of 74.

References

 General
 
 
 Specific

1874 births
1948 deaths
People from Santa Barbara, California
Mayors of Anchorage, Alaska